Nadia Chafik (born 02 01 1962 in Casablanca) is a Moroccan novelist.

Biography 
Nadia Chafik was born in Casablanca in 1962, and grew up in Rabat. She is from the Ait Sadden tribe, a Middle Atlas Berber tribe. Chafik studied at Montreal University (Master & Ph.D) and she taught (as "Chargée de cours") in the same university during two years. Her principal academic works are: "Être romancière au Maghreb" (1988) and Une autre lecture du Maghreb à travers l'art scriptural et pictural français du 19e siècle (1998).

After teaching also at Ibn Tofaïl University of Kénitra, Nadia Chafik follows her career at Mohammed V University of Rabat where she teaches Literature and organizes some cultural activities like: "Ateliers d'écriture", or "Rencontres avec les auteurs".

She published short stories and three novels. Nos jours aveugles (Our blind days) is her first collection of short stories. The last one is: Tête de poivre (April, 2012) for which she was nominated for the Prix Grand Atlas 2012 of French Embassy. A critic of French Institute in Morocco writes about this book: " autant de fragments de vie qui mettent à l'honneur la poésie de l'existence".

Selected works

Books
L'atelier d'écriture. Un Laboratoire à large spectre didactique, academic work, 2013
Tête de poivre, short stories, 2012
Nos jours aveugles, short stories, 2005

Le secret des djinns, novel, 1998 - A strange man story.
Filles du vent, novel, 1995 -  Madness and misfortune's single mother

Collective books
37 printemps, Écoute retomber le silence (extract), poetry, in Mots de neige, de sable et d'Océan, 2008
Clair-Obscur, in Regards d'enfant, 2003 
 Ce pays, ne l'as-tu pas rêve ?, in Perles de l'Atlantique. Les Carnets marocains, short text, 2001
Le Tatouage bleu, in Des Nouvelles du Maroc, 1999
Écoute retomber le silence (extract), poetry, in Sources - Revue de la Maison de la Poésie, Namur n°18, 1997
Entre chiens et loups, in  Anthologie de la nouvelle maghrébine, 1996  
Bribes, in Liberté n°182, Montréal-Canada, 1989

References

External links

 "Au-delà de la condition des femmes : les romans de Nadia Chafik", by Mana Derakhshani, Saint Mary’s College  p. 8
 Radio Interview, by Patrice Martin, Médi1 
 Photo 
 Photo 

1962 births
Living people
Berber writers
Academic staff of Mohammed V University
Moroccan women writers
Moroccan writers in French
People from Casablanca
Université de Montréal alumni